The Sudan men's national under-18 basketball team is a national basketball team of Sudan, administered by the Sudan Basketball Association.
It represents the country in international under-18 (under age 18) basketball competitions.

It appeared at the 2008 FIBA Africa Under-18 Championship qualification stage.

See also
Sudan men's national basketball team

References

External links
Archived records of Sudan team participations

Basketball teams in Sudan
Men's national under-18 basketball teams
Basketball